Account-based selling, also known as account-based sales and hyper-segmented sales is a strategic sales model in which the sale of goods or services is carried out to narrow segments of the target audience or specific decision makers. In a typical ABS concept, the selling company forms a target audience, then divides it into narrow segments to offline selling.

History
Emerged in the mid-2010s as a further development of account-based marketing (ABM) strategy, hyper-segmented sales are considered one of the youngest strategies. However, according to research and consulting company Gartner, from 2020 ABS will be the basis of sales for most technology vendors, and the volume of this market will exceed $5 billion per year.

The ABS concept was developed for use in the B2B industry, where an average of 6.8 people make purchasing decisions. ABS increases sales volumes by involving all key persons in the transaction, offering them targeted presentation content that takes into account only their business interests.

Differences from account-based marketing
Broad industry marketing is not targeted enough to attract the right segment of the target audience. The account-based marketing (ABM) strategy is managed by the marketing department and has a number of limitations. For example, corporate transactions often involve several decision makers, and presentation materials must be prepared for each of them. Contact provided by ABM strategy does not guarantee the continuation of business negotiations. Implementation of ABM strategy provides for lead generation in offline sales, ABS strategy provides for transformation of leads into sales.

ABS strategy implies teamwork of all departments involved in sales of goods or services, primarily sales and marketing departments, as well as corporate coaches and top management. Instead of traditional scenario and template work, ABS departments adapt their activities to specific microsegments of the target audience, focusing on personalized interaction with multiple stakeholders. This is not a quantitative approach, but a qualitative one, which considers each microsegment of the target audience as a market.

ABS takes into account the microsegments that have been identified by ABM and develops them to generate income. With this strategy, an individual approach is developed that takes into account the interests and pain points of the decision maker.

ABS is considered a tool to bridge the gap between marketing and sales departments. Since ABS strategy involves going beyond the initial sales, it is used to scale up companies and increase sales volumes.

See also
Customer relationship management
Account-based marketing
 Selvery

References 

Sales
Marketing